Oakley George Kelly (December 3, 1891 – June 5, 1966) was a record setting pilot for the United States Army Air Service.

Biography 
He was born on December 3, 1891 in Pennsylvania and grew up in Grove City.

In May 1922, Lieutenant Oakley G. Kelly and Lieutenant John Arthur Macready were awarded the 1922 Mackay Trophy for the beating the world's air endurance record and staying aloft for 36 hours, 4 minutes, and 32 seconds.

In October 1924, Kelly piloted Ezra Meeker along portions of the Oregon Trail to generate support for marking and preserving the historic route using the same airplane in which Kelley had set the record: a single-engine, high-wing Army Fokker T-2. Traveling by air at 100 mph, Meeker traveled the same distance in an hour that had taken him a week to travel by ox at 2 mph.

Between 1924 and 1929, Kelly was the squadron commander for the 321st Observation Squadron at Pearson Field, Vancouver, Washington. Kelly retired from military service as a Colonel on March 31, 1948. He died at age 74 in San Diego, California in 1966.

References

See also 

Aviators from Pennsylvania
United States Army Air Forces pilots
United States Army Air Forces officers
United States Army Air Forces personnel of World War II
Mackay Trophy winners
1891 births
1966 deaths
Flight endurance record holders
American aviation record holders